XHAGI-FM is a community radio station in Aguililla, Michoacán, broadcasting on 100.3 FM. XHAGI is owned by Expresión Cultural Aguililla, A.C. and known as Expresión FM.

History
XHAGI received its social community concession on September 23, 2016.

References

Radio stations in Michoacán
Community radio stations in Mexico
Radio stations established in 2016